Louisiana's 14th State Senate district is one of 39 districts in the Louisiana State Senate. It has been represented by Democrat Cleo Fields since 2020, succeeding fellow Democrat Yvonne Dorsey-Colomb.

Geography
District 14 is located entirely within East Baton Rouge Parish, including most of downtown Baton Rouge and the main campus of Louisiana State University.

The district is split between Louisiana's 2nd and 6th congressional districts, and overlaps with the 29th, 61st, 63rd, 66th, 67th, 68th, 70th, and 101st districts of the Louisiana House of Representatives.

Recent election results
Louisiana uses a jungle primary system. If no candidate receives 50% in the first round of voting, when all candidates appear on the same ballot regardless of party, the top-two finishers advance to a runoff election.

2019

2015

2011

Federal and statewide results in District 14

References

Louisiana State Senate districts
East Baton Rouge Parish, Louisiana